John Black (8 January 1818 – 11 February 1882) was a Presbyterian clergyman who had emigrated from Scotland to New York State.

After a time in the United States preparing himself for the ministry, Black attended Free Church's college (later Knox College) in Toronto. He became an ordained minister and was a reluctant placement at the Red River Colony. He arrived there in 1851 and, in 1853, married a local girl, the daughter of Alexander Ross.

At Red River Black worked with the Presbyterian congregation who were mainly of Scottish descent and, because of a good knowledge of French, became interested in the Métis and Indian population. During the Riel conflicts, he attempted to mediate between the English- and French-speaking interests in the settlement. Later in his life he received an honorary dd from Queen's College in Kingston.

Black had a second marriage to the sister of Andrew Graham Ballenden Bannatyne.

References 
 

1818 births
1882 deaths
Canadian Presbyterian ministers
People of the Red River Rebellion